The Frank L. Chenoweth House is located in Monroe, Wisconsin.

History
Frank L. Chenoweth was a successful merchant. His house become a prominent location for social gatherings in Monroe. It was listed on the National Register of Historic Places in 1976 and on the State Register of Historic Places in 1989.

References

Houses on the National Register of Historic Places in Wisconsin
National Register of Historic Places in Green County, Wisconsin
Houses in Green County, Wisconsin
Queen Anne architecture in Wisconsin
Brick buildings and structures
Houses completed in 1889